Heath Lane Academy is a co-educational secondary school and sixth form located in Earl Shilton, Leicestershire, England. It has been previously known as William Bradford Academy, William Bradford Community College and, before this, as Earl Shilton Community College. In summer 2016, the nearby Heathfield Academy closed and merged with William Bradford Academy at their site with the new academy rebranded as Heath Lane Academy, also known in abbreviated form as HLA.

Overseas links
The college has links in China, as of 1998. The college has links to Mianyang Nanshan Bilingual School in the Sichuan province of the People's Republic of China. There have been many visits between schools; the most recent in July 2009. Twelve students and two teachers from Earl Shilton visited Mianyang to embark on various scientific studies with students from the School.

Academic performance
100% of students passed five GCSEs at grade C or above for the academic year 2010/11

4% of students passed A-level examinations( A-E grades) in the academic year 2010/11

References

External links
 Heath Lane Academy - official web site
 William Bradford Community College at dcsf.gov.uk
 EduBase
 Heliping with chinese earthquake in June 2008

Secondary schools in Leicestershire
Academies in Leicestershire